David Smellie (1874–unknown) was a Scottish footballer who played in the Football League for Newcastle United and Nottingham Forest.

References

1874 births
Year of death unknown
Scottish footballers
English Football League players
Association football forwards
Pollokshields Athletic F.C. players
Albion Rovers F.C. players
Nottingham Forest F.C. players
Newcastle United F.C. players
Motherwell F.C. players
Bristol Rovers F.C. players